Bruno Sotty (born 1 November 1949 in Chablis) is a French former racing driver.

References

1949 births
Living people
French racing drivers
24 Hours of Le Mans drivers
Sportspeople from Yonne
20th-century French people